James Cannon may refer to:

James P. Cannon (1890–1974), American Communist and (later) Trotskyist leader
James Cannon (mathematician) (1740–1782), Scottish-born mathematician who was one of the principal authors of Pennsylvania's 1776 Constitution
James Cannon Jr. (1864–1944), American temperance leader
James Cannon (rugby union) (born 1988), English rugby union player
Jim Cannon (footballer, born 1953), Scottish football centre half who played for the English club Crystal Palace
Jim Cannon (footballer, born 1927) (1927–1991), Scottish football inside forward who played for Dunfermline, St Johnstone, Albion Rovers and Darlington
Jimmy Cannon (1909–1973), American sports writer
James M. Cannon (1918–2011), American journalist and political adviser to President Gerald Ford
James H. Cannon, founder of the Cannon Electric Company
James W. Cannon (born 1943), American mathematician working in geometric group theory and low-dimensional topology
James William Cannon (1852–1921), American industrialist
SS James W. Cannon, a Liberty ship 
D. James Cannon (1919–1998), member of the Utah House of Representatives
James E. Cannon (1873–1942), American politician in the Virginia Senate
Jim Cannon (curler), Scottish curler